The New York Connecting Railroad  or NYCR is a rail line in the borough of Queens in New York City. It links New York City and Long Island by rail directly to the North American mainland. Amtrak, CSX, Canadian Pacific Railway, Providence and Worcester Railroad and New York and Atlantic Railway (NYAR) currently use the line.  It runs from the Hell Gate Bridge over the East River to Fresh Pond Junction yard in Glendale in Queens. It was completed in 1917. Amtrak uses the northernmost section of the line from Sunnyside Junction (Bowery Bay) in the Woodside section of Queens to the Hell Gate Bridge into the Bronx from which it follows the line north to Boston. 

Amtrak owns the line north of Sunnyside Junction, which forms part of the Northeast Corridor. From this point to Fresh Pond Junction CSX is the owner, with the line known as the Fremont Secondary. South of Fresh Pond, the line leads into the Bay Ridge Branch, a freight-only branch owned by the Long Island Rail Road (LIRR) and operated by the New York and Atlantic Railway.

Route description
The line begins at the Hell Gate Bridge over the East River. Continuing south, the line is on a high-level elevated viaduct over Astoria and Interstate 278 (Grand Central Parkway). The line is then on an embankment until Sunnyside Junction, where Amtrak's Northeast Corridor line branches off. The line heads south and parallels Interstate 278 (Brooklyn Queens Expressway) for a distance. This portion of the line was completely rebuilt in 2002. Now in the section of Elmhurst, the NYCR passes under several streets in a cut. An arched concrete viaduct over Queens Boulevard is followed by cuts and overpasses over streets in Maspeth, Queens. 

After crossing under the Long Island Expressway (Interstate 495) and passing a few cemeteries, the line reaches Fresh Pond Junction. This is the main facility for shipping freight by rail in and out of New York City and Long Island. The New York and Atlantic Railway, which operates freights on the Long Island Rail Road under a privatized concession, has its main offices at Fresh Pond. CSX and PW also interchange freight with NYAR here.

South of Fresh Pond Junction, the line continues south as the LIRR's Bay Ridge Branch to the 65th Street Yard.

The line has 3 tracks to the north of Sunnyside Junction and 1 track to the south of this point (with 2-track sections in some areas).

There is a proposal to connect to the Spuyten Duyvil and Port Morris Railroad spur between the Northeast Corridor at 141st Street to the Harlem Line at 163rd Street and Melrose Avenue, as part of a New York City Subway circumferential line called Triboro RX.

Operation
CSX serves the line with 1–3 daily round trips, with trains based out of Oak Point Yard. The CSX trains bring general freight to the interchange with the New York and Atlantic Railway at Fresh Pond Junction, in Queens, and return with empties and container loads of solid waste. Providence and Worcester runs three trains per week carrying gravel from Cedar Hill Yard in New Haven, CT, to Fresh Pond.

Origins 
The New York Connecting Railroad was incorporated on April 21, 1892, and was jointly owned by the New York, New Haven and Hartford Railroad (the "New Haven") and the Pennsylvania Railroad (PRR). The line opened in 1917 as a connection between the New Haven's Harlem River and Port Chester Railroad and the PRR East River Tunnels to Penn Station and the North River Tunnels under the Hudson River.

The line was dedicated on March 9, 1917 by PRR President Samuel Rea and engineer Gustav Lindenthal. A special train took the directors of the New Haven over the line on March 25, 1917, and at that time it was turned over to the New Haven for operation, though the Southern Division (freight-only) was not yet complete. Passenger service began on April 1, 1917, with the return of the Federal Express and the rerouting of two local trains. The Colonial began using it April 30, resulting in the first accident on the NYCR on August 20, 1917. Through freights to Bay Ridge began January 17, 1918, and the final work was completed August 7, 1918.

Electrification 

The New York Connecting Railroad was electrified around 1927 as an extension of the New Haven's system. The NYCR system encompassed 20 route miles (32 km) of track, and was electrified, like the New Haven, using overhead catenary at 11 kV, 25 Hz. The system received power from the New Haven Cos Cob Power Station and Consolidated Edison 201st generating station via the West Farms substation.  Additional power was supplied from a 5 MW, 7 kVA, 11 kV, three-phase to single-phase converter installed at East New York. This unit was also operated in synchronous condenser mode for reactive power support. (See Amtrak's 25 Hz traction power system.)

Like the New Haven, the NYCR traction power was distributed using the 2 x 11 kV autotransformer topology. Two wires, the feeder and the catenary (often called the trolley wire), carried voltage of 11 kV to ground, but of opposite phase such that the feeder and catenary were 22 kV phase-to-phase.  Six autotransformer stations, spaced an average of 3.8 miles apart along the line, converted power.  Each station contained oil circuit breakers for both feeder and trolley buses, bus sectioning switches, and one  3 MVA outdoor autotransformer.

The LIRR portion of the system (essentially everything to the south of Bowery Bay), along with the freight catenary from West Farms over Hell Gate to Bowery Bay, was removed in 1969-1970. By 1986 Amtrak, which had inherited the Connecting Railroad, changed the traction power system over to 60 Hz operation coincident with the Metro-North Railroad re-powering of the New Haven Line at 60 Hz and de-activation of the Cos Cob Power Station. The autotransformer architecture was retained, but the source of power changed from the Metro-North New Haven Line system to the Con Edison-supplied Van Nest Substation.

See also

Pennsylvania Tunnel and Terminal Railroad (PRR Tunnel Construction Project 1902-1910)

References 

 Morton, R.B. "Arrangements of Feeders and Equipment for Electrified Railways", American Institute of Electrical Engineers, Transactions of the, Vol 47, Issue 4, pp. 1297–1301, 1928. Discusses both original and 1930s vintage PRR electrification systems along with NY Connecting RR system.

External links

 
 Forgotten New York: "New York Connecting Railroad"
 New York Connecting Railroad Society

Companies affiliated with the New York, New Haven and Hartford Railroad
Companies affiliated with the Pennsylvania Railroad
CSX Transportation lines
Defunct New York (state) railroads
Former Class I railroads in the United States
Railroads transferred to Conrail
Predecessors of Conrail
Rail transportation in New York City
Railway companies established in 1892
Railway companies disestablished in 1976